The 2013 Asia Series was the seventh and final edition of the Asia Series, the premier Asian club baseball tournament, and the ninth time national champions from Asian leagues have competed against each other. The tournament was held in Taichung and Taoyuan, Taiwan, starting on 15 November with the final held on 20 November.

In addition to teams from Nippon Professional Baseball, the Chinese Professional Baseball League, the Korea Baseball Organization, and the Australian Baseball League, this tournament was the first to include a team from Europe. Fortitudo Baseball Bologna was invited to participate as the winners of the 2013 European Cup, a similar tournament in Europe.

The Canberra Cavalry from Australia defeated the Uni-President 7-Eleven Lions of Taiwan 14–4 in the tournament final for their first Asia Series title. It was the first time that an Australian team had won the tournament, as well as the first time the tournament had been won by a team from outside of either Japan or South Korea.

Participating teams

Venues

Round-robin stage

Group A

Group B

Knock-out stage

Final standings

Game-fixing allegation
After the conclusion of the series, Canberra Cavalry player Matt Blazynski claimed that he was offered $30,000 to fix the final game with Uni-President 7-Eleven Lions. Blazynski claimed that he was approached by an individual with an unspecified amount of cash at a night club, and was promised $30,000 in return for fixing the game on the next day. The claim was investigated by both the police of Taiwan and the CPBL.

On December 16, CPBL issued a statement and demanded a public apology from ABL. In the statement, CPBL explained that its investigation revealed several inconsistencies between Blazynski's claim and the CCTV footage provided by the night club's security team. For example, Blazynski claimed he was approached by a male individual who showed him a stack of cash. The footage obtained by CPBL shows him approaching a group of three individuals, including two males and one female, and there is no evidence any of them produce the money Blazynski mentioned. These individuals were also interviewed by either the police or CPBL, and there is no evidence suggesting any criminal connection. Furthermore, contrary to his claim that he returned to the hotel at 2:30AM, CCTV footage provided by the hotel reveals that he returned to the hotel around 4:00 with a female individual, who left the hotel approximately two hours later. CPBL also claimed that Blazynski has refused or is unwilling to provide any evidence to substantiate his claim or to explain the inconsistencies between his claim and the recording at the night club. CPBL stated that it is suspending any ongoing cooperation or exchange programs with ABL until the demand of apology is met.

References

External links
 2013 Asia Series Official website 

Asia Series
Asia Series
Asia Series
Canberra Cavalry